Filipe Andrade Teixeira (born 2 October 1980) is a Portuguese retired footballer.

Regarded as technical and creative, he was capable of playing in several midfield positions, and he competed professionally in five countries his own notwithstanding, mainly Romania.

Club career

Early years
Born in Boulogne-Billancourt, France, Teixeira started his senior career with Felgueiras in the Segunda Liga, being an automatic first-choice since the age of 18.

After a career-best nine goals in 2000–01 season, he returned to his nation of birth – his parents were Portuguese immigrants – and signed with Ligue 2 club Istres.

Paris Saint-Germain
Although he appeared sparingly for the Bouches-du-Rhône side in his only season, Teixeira joined the Ligue 1 after being transferred to Paris Saint-Germain where he teamed up with Brazil's Ronaldinho, being rarely used during his spell with the capital side.

Teixeira then returned to Portugal, making his Primeira Liga debut at Vítor Pontes's União de Leiria, on loan, and playing alongside fellow Portuguese Hugo Almeida and Luís Filipe. At the end of the campaign he went back to PSG, and shared teams up with two more compatriots: Pauleta and Hugo Leal.

Another move to Portugal followed, as Teixeira signed for Académica de Coimbra. With the Students, he only missed five league game in two seasons combined, helping the team to consecutive 13th-place finishes (the competition changed from 18 to 16 clubs for 2006–07).

West Bromwich Albion
Teixeira completed a move to West Bromwich Albion on 17 July 2007 for a fee of £600,000, signing a three-year contract. He made his pre-season debut one week later against Northampton Town, scoring twice, and his first appearance in the Football League Championship came in a 1–2 defeat at Burnley, on the opening day of the season.

Teixeira scored his first goal for Albion in a 2–0 home win over Barnsley, on 1 September 2007. His performances in midfield during that month earned him a place on the shortlist for Championship Player of the Month, although the award eventually went to Watford's Darius Henderson.

Teixeira was stretchered off after 18 minutes of WBA's 3–0 home win against Plymouth Argyle in early March 2008, when he landed awkwardly following a clash with Gary Sawyer– initial scans on the player's knee suggested that he had suffered cruciate ligament damage and was "likely to miss the rest of the campaign". The prognosis proved correct and he returned to Portugal to have an operation, before undergoing rehabilitation at former club Académica; as Albion promoted to the Premier League, he contributed with five goals in 30 games.

On 31 January 2010, having appeared scarcely for WBA following his return from injury, Teixeira joined fellow division two club Barnsley, on loan until the rest of the season.

Later career
On 22 June 2010, aged nearly 30, Teixeira joined Ukrainian side Metalurh Donetsk on a two-year contract, after being granted a free transfer from West Bromwich– he teamed up at the club with compatriots China and Mário Sérgio. In February of the following year, however, he was loaned to FC Brașov in Romania, for six-months.

Teixeira continued in Romania and its Liga I for the 2011–12 season, signing for Rapid București. He was released from his contract after the club entered administration, and moved to the United Arab Emirates with Al-Shaab.

Teixeira returned to Romania in the summer of 2013, joining Petrolul Ploiești. He scored seven league goals in 29 games in his debut campaign, helping his new team to the third position with the subsequent qualification to the UEFA Europa League; on 7 August 2014 he opened the scoring against Viktoria Plzeň, contributing to 4–1 away win for the third qualifying round of the Europa League (5–2 on aggregate).

On 23 June 2017, after spending the preceding two seasons with Astra Giurgiu where he won the national title, Teixeira signed a one-year contract with FCSB. He netted his first competitive goal on 25 July, his header helping to a 2–2 home draw to Viktoria Plzeň for the third qualifying round of the UEFA Champions League; he scored again in the second leg, a 4–1 victory where he also obtained a penalty.

Career statistics

Club

Honours
West Bromwich Albion
Championship: 2007–08

Astra Giurgiu
Liga I: 2015–16
Supercupa României: 2016
Cupa României runner-up: 2016–17

Portugal
UEFA European Under-18 Championship: 1999

References

External links

1980 births
Living people
French people of Portuguese descent
Sportspeople from Boulogne-Billancourt
Portuguese footballers
Association football midfielders
Primeira Liga players
Liga Portugal 2 players
F.C. Felgueiras players
U.D. Leiria players
Associação Académica de Coimbra – O.A.F. players
Ligue 1 players
Ligue 2 players
FC Istres players
Paris Saint-Germain F.C. players
Premier League players
English Football League players
West Bromwich Albion F.C. players
Ukrainian Premier League players
FC Metalurh Donetsk players
Liga I players
FC Brașov (1936) players
FC Rapid București players
FC Petrolul Ploiești players
FC Astra Giurgiu players
FC Steaua București players
UAE Pro League players
Al-Shaab CSC players
Portugal youth international footballers
Portugal under-21 international footballers
Portuguese expatriate footballers
Expatriate footballers in France
Expatriate footballers in England
Expatriate footballers in Ukraine
Expatriate footballers in Romania
Expatriate footballers in the United Arab Emirates
Portuguese expatriate sportspeople in France
Portuguese expatriate sportspeople in England
Portuguese expatriate sportspeople in Ukraine
Portuguese expatriate sportspeople in Romania
Portuguese expatriate sportspeople in the United Arab Emirates
Footballers from Hauts-de-Seine